Vincent Wan may refer to:

 Wan Yeung-ming (born 1958), Hong Kong actor
 Vincent Wan (actor) (born 1984), Hong Kong actor